Masters is a surname. It may refer to:

Persons
A. J. Masters (1950–2015), American country music singer
Alexander Masters, author, screenwriter and worker with the homeless
Anthony Masters (1919–1990), British production designer and set decorator
Ben Masters (born 1947), American actor
Billy Masters (disambiguation)
Blake Masters, American writer, director, and producer of films and television series
Blythe Masters (born 1969), economist and current head of global commodities at J.P. Morgan Chase
Brian Masters (born 1939), British writer
Brian Masters (bishop) (1932–1998), Church of England bishop
Charles Harcourt Masters (born 1759), English surveyor and architect in Bath
Chris Masters (born 1983), American professional wrestler, whose real name is Chris Mordetzky
David Masters (born 1978), English cricketer
Dru Masters (born 1965), British composer, best known for composing television music
Edgar Lee Masters (1868–1950), American poet
Edith Master (1932–2013), American equestrian
Geoff Masters (born 1950), former Australian tennis player
Gerald Masters (1955–2007), musician, solo artist and songwriter, achieving fame during the late seventies and early eighties
Gil Masters , professor of Civil and Environmental Engineering (emeritus) at Stanford University
Grant Masters, English actor.
Hilary Masters (born 1928), American writer
Ian Masters (journalist), Australian-born, BBC-trained American broadcast journalist, commentator, author, screenwriter and documentary filmmaker
Ian Masters (songwriter) (born 1964), multi-instrumentalist/songwriter/producer
Isabell Masters (1913–2011), perennial third-party candidate (Looking Back Party) for President of the United States
Jack Masters (born 1931), former Canadian politician
James M. Masters, Sr. (1911–1988), United States Marine Corps lieutenant general
James Masters (Gaelic footballer) (born 1982), Irish sports-person
Jamie Masters (born 1955), retired Canadian professional ice hockey player
John Masters (1914–1983), English officer in the British Indian Army and novelist
Joshua Masters (born 1995), English squash player
Josiah Masters (1763–1822), United States Representative from New York 
Kent Masters King (born 1974), American actress  appearing on the daytime soap opera General Hospital
Marie Masters (born 1941), American actress
Mark Masters, American radio company owner
Mark Masters (musician) (born 1957), American jazz trumpeter, composer and arranger
Martha Masters, American classical guitarist
Maxwell T. Masters (1833–1907), English botanist and taxonomist
 Michael G. Masters, US homeland security expert
Mike Masters (born 1967), former U.S. soccer forward who is the first American to score a goal in Wembley Stadium
Oksana Masters (born 1989), Ukraine-born American Paralympic athlete
Olga Masters (1919–1986), Australian journalist, novelist and short story writer
Dr Peter Masters, Minister of the Metropolitan Tabernacle (Spurgeon's)
Read Masters (1900–1967), New Zealand rugby player
Richard Masters (disambiguation)
Richard George Masters (1877–1963), English recipient of the Victoria Cross
Robert Masters (historian) (1713–1798), was an English clergyman and academic
Robert Masters (1879–1967), New Zealand politician of the Liberal Party, and a cabinet minister
Roger Masters (born 1933), the Nelson A. Rockefeller Professor of Government Emeritus and Research Professor in the Department of Government at Dartmouth
Roy Masters (commentator) (born 1928), English radio commentator and author
Roy Masters (sport) (born 1941), Australian rugby league coach, sport administrator and sports journalist
Sammy Masters (1930–2013), American rockabilly musician
Scott Masters, American gay pornographic film director and studio owner 
Steve Masters (disambiguation), various people
Walt Masters (1907–1992), former MLB pitcher and an American football halfback and quarterback in the National Football League
William Masters (1887 – 1983), birth name of the British-Argentine jazz musician Gordon Stretton
William Masters (1915–2001), American gynaecologist and sexologist
William Masters (politician), (1820–1906), American politician
Zeke Masters, alias of Ron Goulart (born 1933), American popular culture historian and author

Fictional characters
 Tony Masters, fictional character in the HBO drama Oz played by Steven Wishnoff
 Alicia Masters, supporting character to the Marvel Comics superheroes the Fantastic Four and Silver Surfer
 Ken Masters, video game character from the Street Fighter series
 Martha Masters (House) PhD, fictional character in the Fox medical drama House
 Robin Masters, fictional character on the American television series Magnum, P.I.
 Vladimir "Vlad" Masters, one of the main antagonists of Danny Phantom
 Meg Masters, fictional character on the CW television series "Supernatural"

See also

 Master (disambiguation)
 Marsters (surname)
 Meister (surname)
 Maistre (surname)
 Maitre (surname)

English-language surnames